The list of ship commissionings in 2004 includes a chronological list of ships commissioned in 2004.  In cases where no official commissioning ceremony was held, the date of service entry may be used instead.


References

See also 

2004
 Ship commissionings
 Ship launches
Ship launches